The Chicago Invitational Challenge was an annual early-season college basketball tournament that took place around Thanksgiving week Division I college basketball tournament  is an annual early-season college basketball tournament that takes place Thanksgiving week. The Chicago Invitational Challenge was first held during the 2006-07 season, the final event occurred during the 2011–12 season. For the format of the tournament the opening two rounds were played on campus sites, The semifinals and finals were contested using a 4 team tournament with a 3rd place game. Throughout the duration of the tournament expect in 2009 the semifinal and final rounds were played at the Sears Centre Arena in Hoffman Estates, Illinois, In 2009 the village of Hoffman Estates, Illinois acquired the NOW Arena (formerly Sears Centre Arena) through a Deed in Lieu of Foreclosure process, as a result the 2009 was Chicago Invitational Challenge was moved to UIC Pavilion. The tournament was owned and operated by Basketball Tournaments, Inc.

Tournament History

Champions

Brackets 
* – Denotes overtime period

2011
Eleventh ranked Wisconsin won the final edition of the tournament 73–56 victory over BYU.

First and Second Rounds

First and Second Round Game played at on campus sites

Championship Round

2010
Richmond was crowned champions of the 2010  Chicago Invitational Challenge as the Spiders upset tenth ranked Purdue 65–54.

First and Second Rounds

First and Second Round Game played at on campus sites

Championship Round

2009
With the temporary closing of Sears Centre Arena on October 1, 2009, The fourth annual Chicago Invitational Challenge was moved to UIC Pavilion in Chicago, Illinois. Northwestern defeated Iowa State 67–65 in the championship game.

First and Second Rounds

First and Second Round Game played at on campus sites

Championship Round

2008
The third Chicago Invitational Challenge was held in a non-bracket format for the upper bracket, with matchups set prior to the tournament, the lower bracket was still held as a four team tournament.

First and Second Rounds

First and Second Round Game played at on campus sites

Championship Round

2007
Xavier won the second Chicago Invitational Challenge defeating eighth ranked Indiana 80-65 in the championship game.

First and Second Rounds

First and Second Round Game played at on campus sites

Championship Round

2006
Illinois won the inaugural Chicago Invitational Challenge defeating Bradley 75–71 in the championship game.

First and Second Rounds

First and Second Round Game played at on campus sites

Championship Round

References

College men's basketball competitions in the United States
Hoffman Estates, Illinois
Basketball competitions in Chicago
2006 establishments in Illinois
Recurring sporting events established in 2006
2011 disestablishments in Illinois